Vasos Dimitriadis is a Cypriot footballer. He played in two matches for the Cyprus national football team in 1960.

References

External links
 

Year of birth missing (living people)
Living people
Cypriot footballers
Cyprus international footballers
Place of birth missing (living people)
Association football midfielders
Nea Salamis Famagusta FC players